Department of Library and Information Science, Shivaji University, Kolhapur (Maharashtra)

List of Library and Information Science Schools in India 

University of Calicut
Aligarh Muslim University
Panjab University
Pondicherry University
Babasaheb Bhimraro Ambedkar University, Lucknow
Delhi University
Calcutta University
Gauhati University
Andhra University
Sri Krishnadevaraya University
Sri Venkateswara University
Pandit Ravishankar Shukla University
Maharaja Sayajirao University of Baroda
Gujarat Vidyapith
North East Frontier Technical University
Himalayan University
Arunachal University of Studies
Admerit College
Patna University
University of Jammu
University of Kashmir
Bangalore University, Bengaluru
Gulbarga University, Kalburgi
Karnataka University, Dharwad
Tumkur University, Tumkur
Bangalore North University, Kolara
Akkamahadevi Women's University, Vijayapura
Vijayanagara Sri Krishnadevaraya University
Rani Channamma University, Belagavi
Kuvempu University, Shivamogga
IPS Academy
Govt. Maharani Laxmi Bai Girls P.G. College
Sarojini Naidu Govt. Girls PG (Autonomous) College
Vikram University
Jiwaji University
Chaudhary Charan Singh Post Graduate College
Vinoba Bhave University
Rabindra Bharati University
Gourbanga University
University of Mysore
Manipur University
Tripura University
Mizoram University
Jadavpur University

References

 
 

Library and Information Science
Library science education
Information schools